Harold David London (28 August 1906 – 29 March 1980) was a New Zealand public servant, philatelist, cycling administrator, editor and local historian. He was born in Kimbolton, Manawatu/Horowhenua, New Zealand on 28 August 1906.

References

1906 births
1980 deaths
20th-century New Zealand historians
New Zealand philatelists
New Zealand public servants